"I'm Free" is a song by the Rolling Stones written by Mick Jagger and Keith Richards, first released as the final track on the UK version of their album  Out of Our Heads on 24 September 1965.  It was also released at the same time as a single in the US and later included on the American December's Children (And Everybody's) album.

Release 
The Rolling Stones recorded a re-worked acoustic version for their 1995 album Stripped, and performed a live version in the 2008 film Shine a Light, which was included on the accompanying live album. The song was also performed at the free concert in Hyde Park, London, on July 5, 1969, released on the DVD The Stones in the Park in 2006. 

In 2007 a remixed version of the original recording was used in a television commercial for the Chase Freedom credit card and in 2008 it was used in a UK commercial for a Renault SUV.

The original vinyl bootleg Live'r Than You'll Ever Be included a live version recorded in Oakland, California, in November 1969.

Music and reception 
Rolling Stone magazine ranked "I'm Free" as the 78th greatest Rolling Stones song, saying: "A tambourine-spangled folk rocker with chime-y, Byrds-like guitar, this offhandedly libertarian tune wasn't a big hit, but it's one of the Sixties' most pliant anthems." The Guardian identified the song as an example of the improving songwriting of Jagger and Richards at the time, describing the song as "gleefully hymning the arrogance of youth."

Cash Box described it as a "raunchy, hard-driving emotion-packed romancer." 

The song uses a line from the Beatles' 1964 song "Eight Days a Week": "Hold me, love me, hold me, love me."

Personnel
 Mick Jagger – lead vocals, backing vocals
 Keith Richards – lead guitar, backing vocals
 Brian Jones – rhythm guitar, organ
 Bill Wyman – bass guitar
 Charlie Watts – drums
 James W. Alexander – tambourine

The Soup Dragons version

Scottish alternative rock/dance band the Soup Dragons covered the song in 1990. Their version featured a toasted verse by Junior Reid. The single became the band's biggest hit, reaching the top ten in the UK, Australia and New Zealand, and charted in other countries as well. The Soup Dragons' version featured in the films Big Girls Don't Cry... They Get Even and The World's End.

Charts

Other cover versions
Pitbull covered this song (with additional lyrics) for the song "Freedom", which was featured in the 2017 film Ferdinand.
 Tichá dohoda released an unplugged version on their 1993 album UnplugGag.
 Dua Lipa sang a special version for a TV commercial for Yves Saint Laurent 2019 (released 2021)

References

The Rolling Stones songs
London Records singles
1965 songs
Songs written by Jagger–Richards
1990 singles
Song recordings produced by Andrew Loog Oldham